The 2012 Swedish Golf Tour, known as the Nordea Tour for sponsorship reasons, was the 27th season of the Swedish Golf Tour, a series of professional golf tournaments for women held in Sweden and Norway.

A number of the tournaments also featured on the 2012 LET Access Series (LETAS).

Schedule
The season consisted of 10 tournaments played between May and September, where one event was held in Norway.

See also
2012 Swedish Golf Tour (men's tour)

References

External links
Official homepage of the Swedish Golf Tour

Swedish Golf Tour (women)
Swedish Golf Tour (women)